Slabinja is a toponym used for two villages divided by the state border at the Una river:
 Donja and Gornja Slabinja, on the right bank, in Bosnia and Herzegovina
 Slabinja, on the left bank, in Croatia